Charlo (is a community in Heron Bay, New Brunswick, Canada. It held village status prior to 2023.

History

Situated on the south shore of Chaleur Bay, the community was first settled by Acadians in 1799 (except for the Thompson family who emigrated from Ireland through the port of New York who settled 1784-1790 and was granted land by the crown in 1824 next to the church property) and incorporated in 1966. River Charlo is one of its neighbourhoods.

On 1 January 2023, Charlo amalgamated with the town of Dalhousie and all or part of five local service districts to form the new town of Heron Bay. The community's name remains in official use.

Demographics 

Population trend

Language
Mother tongue (2016)

Climate

Infrastructure 
The Charlo Airport, the only airport in the region, offered scheduled air service between 1963-2001. In October 2012, Provincial Airlines began trial flights at the Charlo Airport. In January 2013, after deeming that there was sufficient demand, they made the trial flights permanent. They currently provide direct flights between Charlo, New Brunswick and Wabush, Newfoundland and Halifax, Nova Scotia.

Notable people

See also
List of villages in New Brunswick

References

Communities in Restigouche County, New Brunswick
Former villages in New Brunswick